Hard Times: An Oral History of the Great Depression (original: 1970/ latest edition: 2005) is a telling of the oral history of the Great Depression written by Studs Terkel. It is a firsthand account of people of varying socio-economic status who lived in the United States during the Great Depression.

The first edition of the book was published in 1970.  The 1986 print included a new introduction by Terkel.  The latest edition was published in 2005.

Chapters
Foreword, January–February 1986
A Personal Memoir (and parenthetical comment)

Book One
The March
The Song 
Sgt. Pepper’s Lonely Hearts Club Band
Hard Travelin’
The Big Money
Man and Boy
God Bless’ the Child
Bonnie Laboring Boy
Three Strikes

Book Two
Old Families
Member of the Chorus
High Life
At the Clinic
Sixteen Ton
The Farmer is the Man
Editor and Publisher

Book Three
Concerning the New Deal
An Unreconstructed Populist
Peroration (Includes interview with Hamilton Fish III)
Scarlet Banners and Novenas
The Doctor, Huey, and Mr. Smith
The Circuit Rider
The Gentleman from Kansas (Interview with Alf Landon)
A View of the Woods
Campus Life

Book Four
Merely Passing Through
Three O’Clock in the Morning
A Cable

Book Five
The Fine and Lively Arts
Public Servant – The City
Evictions, Arrests, and Other Running Sores
Honor and Humiliation
Strive and Succeed

Epilogue
The Raft
A Touch of Rue

Literary significance and reception

Hard Times is known for providing an equal representation of experiences across a broad spectrum of socio-economic status, interviewing famous and influential people as well as others from a range of cultural and ethnic backgrounds. It has been called "A true classic! Exceptional oral history of a wide strata of Americans caught up in the 'hard times' of the Great Depression."

References

External links
Audio recordings of interviews for Hard Times

Oral history books
1970 non-fiction books
Pantheon Books books
Non-fiction books about the Great Depression